Ausonio Alacevich (born 13 February 1910 – 2001) was a rugby union footballer who played in the 1930s, and 1940s. He played at representative level for Italy, and at club level for R.S. Ginnastica Torino, as a Prop, i.e. number 1 or 3. He was born in Zadar, Austria-Hungary.

Playing career

International honours
Alacevich was a substitute for Italy in the 3-0 victory over Romania at Campo Testaccio, Rome on Saturday 29 April 1939.

Club career
Alacevich was a member of the R.S. Ginnastica Torino team that won the 1947 Campionati italiani. In honour of this, Alacevich's name appears alongside his teammates on a plaque affixed to Motovelodromo Fausto Coppi in Turin, the squad was; Ausonio Alacevich, Guido Aleati, Sergio Aleati, Roberto Antonioli, Angelo Arrigoni, Vincenzo Bertolotto, Bianco, Giovanni Bonino, Campi, Gabriele Casalegno, Chiosso, Chiosso, Guido Cornarino, Mario Dotti IV, Aldo Guglielminotti, Pescarmona, Piovano, Rocca, Felice Rama, Siliquini, Giovanni Tamagno, and Sandro Vigliano.

References

Benedetto Pasqua; Mirio Da Roit, Cent'anni di rugby a Torino (One Hundred Years of Rugby in Turin), Torino, Ananke [2011]
Francesco Volpe; Paolo Pacetti, Rugby 2012, Roma, Zesi [2011]
Gianluca Barca; Gian Franco Bellè, La Sesta Nazione (The Sixth Nation), Parma, Grafiche Step [2008]

External links
Search for "Alacevich" at rugbyleagueproject.org

Croatian rugby union players
Italian rugby union players
Italy international rugby union players
Rugby union props
1910 births
2001 deaths